The Sharpshooter-class torpedo gunboat was a class of torpedo gunboat built for the Royal Navy in the late 19th century.  One of the class was hulked in 1904, seven were scrapped before World War I and five were converted to minesweepers.  Of these minesweepers, Seagull was lost to a collision in 1918 and the rest survived the war to be broken up in the early 1920s.

Design
The Sharpshooter class was designed by Sir William White in 1888. They were engined with two sets of Belliss and Morcom triple-expansion steam engines, two locomotive-type boilers, and twin screws. The following Alarm class were essentially an enlarged version of the Sharpshooters.

From 1895 to 1898 a series of different boilers were fitted to Sharpshooter, Sheldrake, Seagull, Spanker and Salamander.

Armament
At build the class was fitted with two QF /45-pounder guns and four 3-pounder guns.  Five  torpedo tubes were fitted, except in Plassey and Assaye, which had three tubes.  Three reloads were provided.

Those vessels converted to minesweepers in 1909 retained their guns and had a kite winch and gallows fitted on the quarterdeck.

Service
Plassey and Assaye were built for the Bombay Marine (renamed the Royal Indian Marine in 1892). Whiting and Wizard (renamed Boomerang and Karakatta before commissioning) were assigned to the Australia Station.  Seven of the class, including all the colonial service boats, were sold for breaking in 1904 - 1907, and five of the class were converted to minesweepers in 1908 - 1909.  Of the five minesweepers, Seagull was lost in a collision with SS Corrib in the Clyde in 1918, and the others were sold for breaking after World War I.  Sharpshooter was hulked for instructional duties in 1904 and renamed Northampton, surviving until 1922 until being sold for breaking.

Ships

See also
List of torpedo gunboats of the Royal Navy

References

Bibliography

Torpedo gunboat classes
 
 S